Salif Fofana better known by the mononym Salif (born Salif Wonka in 1982), is a French rapper based in Boulogne-Billancourt of Malian and Guadeloupean origin. His musical career began at the age of thirteen when he and EXS formed the rap duo Nysay in 1995. Salif released his first solo album, Tous Ensemble – Chacun Pour Soi, in 2001. To date he has released four studio albums, all of which have entered the Top 75 of the French albums chart. His most commercially successful album so far was Curriculum Vital, which reached a peak position of #9 in the French chart in October 2009.

Discography

Albums

Singles
2009: "Boomerang" 
2010: "Jean Slim"

References

French rappers
1982 births
Living people
French people of Malian descent
French people of Guadeloupean descent